Amadeus is a theophoric given name derived from the Latin words  – the imperative of the word  ("to love") – and  ("god"). As a linguistic compound in the form of a phereoikos, the name can be taken to mean either "love of God", in other words, that the person is loved by God or "one who loves God".

The best-known bearer of the name is the composer Wolfgang Amadeus Mozart.

Equivalent and similar names
Borrowings include the female form, "Amadea", the French "Amédée" (male), the Spanish "Amadeo", the Italian "Amedeo", and "Amadis", the Polish "Amadeusz", the Slovenian "Amadej".

Similar calques include the German "", Slavic names "Bogomil" and "Bohumil" meaning "Dear to God", as well as "Bogolyub", meaning "he who loves God". The Arabic "Habibullah" means "Beloved of God". The Greek name "Theophilos" means "friend of God".

People
Wolfgang Amadeus Mozart (1756–1791), composer
Amadeus Aba
Amadeus de Bie (1844–1920), Belgian Abbot-General of the Cistercian order
Amadeo I of Spain (1845–1890), Italian prince, King of Spain 1870 to 1873
Amadeus I, Count of Savoy
Amadeus II, Count of Savoy
Amadeus III, Count of Savoy
Amadeus IV, Count of Savoy
Amadeus V, Count of Savoy
Amadeus VI, Count of Savoy
Amadeus VII, Count of Savoy
Amadeus VIII, Duke of Savoy, Antipope Felix V
Amadeus IX, Duke of Savoy
Amadeus, Count of Neuchâtel (died 1285), son of Count Rudolph IV and Sybille of Montbéliard
Amadeus, Prince of Achaea (1363–1402), son of James of Piedmont and Marguerite de Beaujeu
Ernst Theodore Amadeus Hoffmann, better known as E.T.A. Hoffmann, writer
Karl Amadeus Hartmann
Rambo Amadeus, pseudonym for the Montenegrin singer-songwriter Antonije Pušić
Victor Amadeus I, Duke of Savoy
Victor Amadeus II of Sardinia
Victor Amadeus III of Sardinia
Amadeus (presenter) (born 1962), Italian television and radio presenter

Fictional characters
Amadeus Arkham, founder of Arkham Asylum in Batman series
Amadeus Cho, Marvel character
Baron Mordo (Karl Amadeus Mordo), Marvel character
Amadeus, fictional artificial intelligence from the 2018 anime Steins;Gate 0

See also
Eleutherodactylus amadeus, species of frog

References

Theophoric names
Latin masculine given names
German masculine given names
English masculine given names